Hamlin County is a county in the U.S. state of South Dakota. As of the 2020 census, the population was 6,164. Its county seat is Hayti. The county was created in 1873 and organized in 1878. It was named for Hannibal Hamlin, Lincoln's first vice-president.

Geography

The terrain of Hamlin County consists of low rolling hills, dotted with small lakes and ponds. The land is largely dedicated to agriculture. The terrain slopes to the south-southeast, and its highest point is on the eastern boundary line, near its NE corner, at 1,949' (594m) ASL.

Major highways

 Interstate 29
 U.S. Highway 81
 South Dakota Highway 21
 South Dakota Highway 22
 South Dakota Highway 28

Adjacent counties

 Codington County - north
 Deuel County - east
 Brookings County - southeast
 Kingsbury County - southwest
 Clark County - west

Protected areas

 Baxter Slough State Public Shooting Area
 Bochek State Public Shooting Area
 Eidsness State Public Shooting Area
 Hamlin State Public Shooting Area
 Harju State Public Shooting Area
 Hayes Slough State Public Shooting Area
 Johnsons Slough State Public Shooting Area
 McShane State Public Shooting Area
 Opdahl Slough State Public Shooting Area
 Rasmussen State Public Shooting Area

Lakes

 Clear Lake
 Dry Lake
 Lake Albert (partial)
 Lake Marsh
 Lake Mary
* Lake Norden
 Lake Poinsett
 Lake Saint John

Demographics

2000 census
As of the 2000 United States Census, there were 5,540 people, 2,048 households, and 1,452 families in the county. The population density was 11 people per square mile (4/km2). There were 2,626 housing units at an average density of 5 per square mile (2/km2). The racial makeup of the county was 98.48% White, 0.13% Black or African American, 0.58% Native American, 0.18% Asian, 0.11% from other races, and 0.52% from two or more races. 0.63% of the population were Hispanic or Latino of any race. 28.7% were of German, 21.8% Norwegian, 13.0% Finnish and 7.6% American ancestry, 95.2% spoke English, 2.6% German and 1.5% Spanish as their first language.

There were 2,048 households, out of which 33.80% had children under the age of 18 living with them, 63.50% were married couples living together, 4.80% had a female householder with no husband present, and 29.10% were non-families. 27.00% of all households were made up of individuals, and 14.50% had someone living alone who was 65 years of age or older. The average household size was 2.62 and the average family size was 3.22.

The county population contained 29.40% under the age of 18, 6.90% from 18 to 24, 24.00% from 25 to 44, 20.50% from 45 to 64, and 19.20% who were 65 years of age or older. The median age was 38 years. For every 100 females, there were 98.90 males. For every 100 females age 18 and over, there were 96.80 males.

The median income for a household in the county was $33,851, and the median income for a family was $41,511. Males had a median income of $28,446 versus $21,412 for females. The per capita income for the county was $16,982. About 7.20% of families and 12.10% of the population were below the poverty line, including 17.00% of those under age 18 and 14.30% of those age 65 or over.

2010 census
As of the 2010 United States Census, there were 5,903 people, 2,108 households, and 1,483 families in the county. The racial makeup of the county was 96.7% white, 0.3% American Indian, 0.2% black or African American, 0.2% Asian, 1.8% from other races, and 0.8% from two or more races. Those of Hispanic or Latino origin made up 2.5% of the population. In terms of ancestry, 42.3% were German, 24.0% were Norwegian, 7.0% were English, 6.1% were Irish, 5.4% were Dutch, and 5.3% were American.

Of the 2,108 households, 33.2% had children under the age of 18 living with them, 61.4% were married couples living together, 5.6% had a female householder with no husband present, 29.6% were non-families, and 25.6% of all households were made up of individuals. The average household size was 2.68 and the average family size was 3.28. The median age was 36.8 years.

The median income for a household in the county was $44,439 and the median income for a family was $54,483. Males had a median income of $36,921 versus $24,645 for females. The per capita income for the county was $21,558. About 4.9% of families and 7.5% of the population were below the poverty line, including 11.5% of those under age 18 and 7.9% of those age 65 or over.

Communities

Cities

 Bryant
 Castlewood
 Estelline
 Lake Norden

Towns
 Hayti (county seat)
 Hazel

Census-designated place

 Claremont Colony
 Lake Poinsett (part)
 Poinsett Colony

Unincorporated communities
 Baxter Slough
 Dempster
 Thomas

Townships

Brantford
Castlewood
Cleveland
Dempster
Dixon
Estelline
Florence
Garfield
Hamlin
Hayti
Norden
Opdahl
Oxford

Politics
Hamlin County voters have usually voted Republican. In only one national election since 1932 has the county selected the Democratic Party candidate.

Notable people
 

Nicholas Egbert Knight (1866–1946), politician

See also
 National Register of Historic Places listings in Hamlin County, South Dakota

References

 
Watertown, South Dakota micropolitan area
1878 establishments in Dakota Territory
Populated places established in 1878